Robin Huisman de Jong (born 8 June 1988) is a Dutch footballer who plays as a defender for Hoofdklasse club Buitenpost. 

After failing to break through to the Heerenveen first team due to knee injuries, Huisman de Jong moved to BV Cloppenburg in the German Oberliga Niedersachsen in 2009. After returning to the Netherlands two years later, he has appeared for Sneek Wit Zwart and Harkemase Boys.

He is a Dutch youth international; he has played for the U17 and U18 sides, and he was also a member of the Netherlands squad which failed to qualify for the 2007 UEFA European Under-19 Football Championship.

References

External links
 Player profile at Voetbal International

1988 births
Living people
Dutch footballers
Netherlands youth international footballers
People from Sneek
Footballers from Friesland
Association football defenders
SC Heerenveen players
FC Emmen players
BV Cloppenburg players
Oberliga (football) players
Harkemase Boys players
VV Sneek Wit Zwart players
Dutch expatriate footballers
Expatriate footballers in Germany
Dutch expatriate sportspeople in Germany